O'Rear is an Irish surname. Notable people with the surname include:

 Alf O'Rear (1923 – 2018), American politician and member of the Tennessee House of Representatives
 Bob O'Rear, seventh employee of Microsoft and developer of PC DOS
 Charles O'Rear (born 1941), American photographer
 Edward C. O'Rear (1863 – 1961), American politician and Justice of the Kentucky Court of Appeals
 Jim O'Rear, American actor, screenwriter, and director